Constância is a municipality in Santarém District in Portugal. The population in 2011 was 4,056, in an area of 80.37 km².

The present Mayor is António Manuel dos Santos Mendes, elected by the Unitary Democratic Coalition. The municipal holiday is Easter Monday.

Parishes
Administratively, the municipality is divided into 3 civil parishes (freguesias):
 Constância
 Montalvo
 Santa Margarida da Coutada

Notable people 
 Tomaz Vieira da Cruz (1900 in Constância – 1960 in Lisbon) a poet, musician and journalist.

References

External links
Town Hall official website
Photos from Constância

Towns in Portugal
Populated places in Santarém District
Municipalities of Santarém District